This is the discography of British 2-tone/ska band the Beat (known as the English Beat in the US and Canada) and its subsequent incarnations as the Beat featuring Ranking Roger based in the UK, and the English Beat starring Dave Wakeling based in the US.

Albums

Studio albums

The Beat / The English Beat

The Beat featuring Ranking Roger

The Beat starring Dave Wakeling

Live albums

The English Beat

The Beat with Ranking Roger / The Beat featuring Ranking Roger

Compilation albums

Box sets

Singles

The Beat / The English Beat

The Beat featuring Ranking Roger

The English Beat starring Dave Wakeling

Videos

Video albums

Music videos

Notes

References

Discographies of British artists
New wave discographies